Satres is a former community in the Xanthi regional unit, East Macedonia and Thrace, Greece. Since the 2011 local government reform it is part of the municipality Myki, of which it is a municipal unit. The municipal unit has an area of 149.327 km2. Population 483 (2011). The community Satres consists of the settlements Satres, Akraios, Gidotopos, Dourgouti, Kalotycho, Koundouros, Lykotopos, Polyskio, Potamochori, Rematia, Temenos and Tsalapeteinos.

References

Populated places in Xanthi (regional unit)